Sapci may refer to:

 Şapçı, a village in Greece
 Sapci, Croatia, a village near Garčin, Croatia
 Şapcı, Mustafakemalpaşa